Geronimo was a pioneer vintage era American automobile, built at 409 South Grand in Enid, Oklahoma, between 1917 and 1920. It was what would today be called an "assembled car", relying on proprietary parts from outside suppliers. In addition, the company made tractors.

History
The Geronimo Motor Company was founded in 1917 by William C. Allen and incorporated with a $500,000 stock sale.

One model was a roadster, the other a five-passenger tourer. Geronimo also produced cars under the marque Wing for export to France.

The cars were distributed by agencies across the Midwest, in Kansas, Nebraska, West Texas, and Oklahoma. The 4A-40 was priced at $895, the 6A-45 at $1,295. By contrast, the Cole 30 and 
Colt Runabout were $1,500, the Model S $700, and the high-volume Oldsmobile Runabout was $650.

Despite its price, the Geronimo proved popular enough that the company built a new  factory on the outskirts of Enid, completed in the fall of 1917. As a result, both production and capitalization expanded, and in January 1919, the company sold another $500,000 in stock. By 1919, unit price had climbed as high as $1995, into the range of the $1750 FAL or $2,000 Enger 40. On 14 August 1920, the plant suffered a severe fire which did $250,000 in damage. Insurance only covered $65,000, and the company was forced to close.

At its peak, between 40  and a peak of 125 workers were employed, producing and selling a total of 600 cars, though production levels may have reached 1000. Only one survives, a restored example found in a field near LaCross, Kansas, in 1972. It is now owned by the Enid Region of the Antique Automobile Club of America, and is still regularly used in parades and community historical events.

See also
List of automobile manufacturers
List of defunct United States automobile manufacturers

References

Defunct motor vehicle manufacturers of the United States
Enid, Oklahoma
1910s cars
1920s cars
Luxury motor vehicle manufacturers
American companies established in 1917
Vehicle manufacturing companies established in 1917
Vehicle manufacturing companies disestablished in 1920
1917 establishments in Oklahoma
1920 disestablishments in Oklahoma
Defunct manufacturing companies based in Oklahoma